Philip Salomons (1796–1867) was an English financier, Jewish leader and High Sheriff of Sussex.

Early life
Philip Salomons was born in London in 1796. He travelled extensively in the United States as a young man, and became a naturalized American citizen in 1826. Later that year, however, he returned to England and resumed his British citizenship. His father was a financier in the City of London, as was his brother, Sir David Salomons (1797–1873).

Career
Salomons became a financier in the City of London.

Judaism
Salomons followed his father as Warden of London's New Synagogue in 1843. He succeeded his brother as a representative on the Board of Deputies of British Jews. A devout man, he had his own private Roof-top synagogue on top of his Hove home. He was a noted collector of  antique Judaica. The Tablets of the Ten Commandments from the synagogue are preserved in the collection of the Salomons Museum in Tunbridge Wells.

Public office
Salomons served as Justice of the Peace, High Sheriff of Sussex (1852) and Deputy Lieutenant of the County.

Personal life
Salomons married Emma Abigail Montefiore (1833–1859) in 1850 when he was 54 and she was 17. She died aged 26 and he died eight years later; their children were reared by Sir David Salomons. The couple are buried in the West Ham Jewish Cemetery. They had a son, Sir David Lionel Salomons (1851–1925).

References

1796 births
1867 deaths
Bankers from London
People from Hove
English Jews
High Sheriffs of Sussex
Members of the Board of Deputies of British Jews
Deputy Lieutenants of Sussex
19th-century English businesspeople